Nino Agostino Arturo Maria Ferrari, known as Nino Ferrer (15 August 1934 – 13 August 1998), was an Italian-born French singer-songwriter and author.

Biography and career

Nino Ferrer was born on 15 August 1934 in Genoa, Italy, but lived the first years of his life in New Caledonia (an overseas territory of France in the southwest Pacific Ocean), where his father, an engineer, was working. Jesuit religious schooling, first in Genoa and later in Saint-Jean de Passy, Paris, left him with a lifelong aversion to the Church. From 1947, the young Nino studied ethnology and archaeology in the Sorbonne university in Paris, also pursuing his interests in music and painting.

After completing his studies, Ferrer started traveling the world, working on a freighter ship. When he returned to France he immersed himself in music. A passion for jazz and the blues led him to worship the music of James Brown, Otis Redding and Ray Charles. He started to play the double bass in Bill Coleman's New Orleans Jazz Orchestra. He appeared on a recording for the first time in 1959, playing bass on two 45 singles by the Dixie Cats. The suggestion to take up solo singing came from the rhythm 'n' blues singer Nancy Holloway, whom he also accompanied.

In 1963, Nino Ferrer recorded his own first record, the single "Pour oublier qu'on s'est aimé" ("To forget we were in love"). 
The B-side of that single had a song "C'est irréparable", which was translated for Italian superstar Mina as "Un anno d'amore" and became a big hit in 1965. Later again, in 1991, Spanish singer Luz Casal had a hit with "Un año de amor", translated from Italian by director Pedro Almodóvar for his film Tacones Lejanos (High Heels).

His first solo success came in 1965 with the song "Mirza". Other hits, such as "Cornichons" and "Oh! hé! hein! bon!" followed, establishing Ferrer as something of a comedic singer. The stereotyping and his eventual huge success made him feel "trapped", and unable to escape from the constant demands of huge audiences to hear the hits he himself despised. He started leading a life of "wine, women and song" while giving endless provocative performances in theatres, on television and on tour.

In Italy, he scored a major hit in 1967 with "La pelle nera" (the French version is "Je voudrais être un noir" ["I'd like to be a black man"]). This soul song, with its quasi-revolutionary lyrics  imploring a series of Ferrer's black music idols to gift him their black skin for the benefit of music-making, achieved long-lasting iconic status in Italy.

"La pelle nera" was followed by a string of other semi-serious Italian songs, which included two appearances at the Sanremo Music Festival (in 1968 and 1970). In 1970, he returned to France and resumed his musical career there. Ferrer rebelled against the "gaudy frivolity" of French show business, filled with what he perceived as its "cynical technocrats and greedy exploiters of talent" (he had considered leaving show business altogether in 1967, when he left France for Italy). In his lesser-known songs, which the public largely ignored, he mocked life's absurdities. He agreed with Serge Gainsbourg and Claude Nougaro that songs are a "minor art" and "just background noise".

In 1975 he started breeding horses in Quercy, France. In 1989, Ferrer  obtained French citizenship, which he explained as his "celebration of the bicentenary of the French Revolution." He went on to record the French national anthem, accompanied by a choir.

A couple of months after his mother died, Ferrer, on 13 August 1998, two days before his 64th birthday, took his hunting gun and walked to a field of corn, recently cut, near the neighbouring village of Saint-Cyprien. There, he lay down in a grove nearby and shot himself in the chest. His wife Kinou, with whom he had two sons, had already alerted the gendarmerie after finding a farewell letter in the house. Next day, there were front-page headlines in most French and Italian newspapers, such as "Adieu Nino!", "Nino Ferrer Hung Up His Telephone", "Our Nino Has Left for the South." They called him the Don Quixote and the Corto Maltese of French show business.

Discography

Studio albums
1966: Enregistrement public
1967: Nino Ferrer
1969: Nino Ferrer
1972: Métronomie
1972: Nino Ferrer and Leggs
1974: Nino and Radiah
1975: Suite en œuf
1977: Véritables variétés verdâtres
1979: Blanat
1981: La carmencita
1982: Ex-libris
1983: Rock'n'roll cow-boy
1986: 13e album
1993: La désabusion
1993: La vie chez les automobiles

Live albums
1970: Rats and Rolls
1995: Concert chez Harry

45RPM singles and 4-track EPs 
 1963 Pour oublier qu'on s'est aimé ; Souviens-toi / C'est irréparable ; 5 bougies bleues 
 1964 Ferme la porte ; Je reviendrai / Oh ! Ne t'en va pas ; Ce que tu as fait de moi (Nino Ferrer et les Jubilées) 
 1964 Les Dolly Brothers (Nino sings on Hello, Dolly! Though he isn't credited. 
 1965 Viens je t'attends ; Au bout de mes vingt ans / Jennifer James ; Tchouk-ou-tchouk
 1966 Mirza ; Les cornichons / Il me faudra… Natacha ; Ma vie pour rien
 1966 Le monkiss de la police ; Monkiss est arrivé / Avec toi j'ai compris le monkiss ; Y'a que toi monkiss (Nino Ferrer et les Gottamou)
 1966 Alexandre ; Oh ! hé ! hein ! bon ! / Le blues des rues désertes ; Longtemps après
 1966 Je veux être noir ; Si tu m'aimes encore / La bande à Ferrer  (parts 1 & 2)
 1967 Le téléfon ; Je cherche une petite fille / Madame Robert ; Le millionnaire
 1967 Mao et Moa ; Je vous dis bonne chance / Mon copain Bismarck ; N-F in trouble
 1968 Le roi d'Angleterre ; Il me faudra… Natacha / Les petites jeunes filles de bonne famille ; Monsieur Machin
 1968 Mamadou Mémé ; Œrythia / Les yeux de Laurence ; Non ti capisco più
 1969 Je vends des robes ; La rua Madureira / Tchouk-ou-tchouk ; Le show-boat de nos amours
 1969 Agata ; Un premier jour sans toi / Justine ; Les hommes à tout faire
 1970 Oui mais ta mère n'est pas d'accord / Le blues anti-bourgeois
 1970 Viens tous les soirs / L'amour, la mort, les enterrements
 1971 Les Enfants de la patrie / La Maison près de la fontaine
 1975 Le Sud / The garden (CBS) - appears only on post-1982 re-releases of the album Nino and Radiah - his biggest hit, reaching number 1 in March 1975
 1975 Alcina de Jesus / Les morceaux de fer (CBS) 
 1976 Chanson pour Nathalie / Moon (CBS)
 1978 Joseph Joseph / L'Inexpressible (CBS)
 1981 Pour oublier qu'on s'est aimé / Michael et Jane (WEA)
 1982 Semiramis / Micky Micky  (WEA)
 1983 Il pleut bergère / Blues des chiens (WEA)
 1986 L'arche de Noé : Création ; Chita Chita / L'arche de Noé 
 1989 La Marseillaise / Il pleut bergère (Barclay) - (the second track was recorded with the townsfolk of his home village)

Revival 
 2015 Le Sud
 2019 La rua Madureira (credited to Bon Entendeur vs Nino Ferrer)

References

Bibliography 
 Christophe Conte and Joseph Ghosn, Nino Ferrer. Du Noir au Sud., Editions no. 1, 2005.
 Frank Maubert, La mélancolie de Nino, Éditions Scali, 2006.
 Henry Chartier, Nino Ferrer: c'est irréparable, Éditions Le Bord de l'eau, 2007.

External links
 Official website

French male songwriters
1934 births
1998 deaths
People from Genoa
Italian emigrants to France
Artists who committed suicide
20th-century French male singers
Saint-Jean de Passy alumni
People with acquired French citizenship
1998 suicides
Suicides by firearm in France